Scotts Seaplane Base  is a public use seaplane base located in the community of Crane Lake, in Saint Louis County, Minnesota, United States. It is privately owned by Darrell Scott and is also known at Scott's Seaplane Base.

Although most U.S. airports use the same three-letter location identifier for the FAA and IATA, Scotts Seaplane Base is assigned CDD by the FAA but has no designation from the IATA (which assigned CDD to Cauquira, Honduras).

Facilities and aircraft 
It has two seaplane landing areas: 7W/25W is 8,000 x 1,000 feet (2,438 x 305 m) and 16W/34W is 7,000 x 1,000 feet (2,134 x 305 m). For the 12-month period ending June 30, 2003, the airport had 8,000 aircraft operations, an average of 21 per day: 61% general aviation and 39% air taxi.

References

External links 
Scott's Resort & Seaplane Base

Airports in Minnesota
Seaplane bases in the United States
Buildings and structures in St. Louis County, Minnesota
Transportation in St. Louis County, Minnesota